Musique pour Supermarché (English title: Music for Supermarkets) is the sixth studio album by electronic musician and composer Jean-Michel Jarre. Only a single copy was pressed and distributed, and its master plates were deliberately destroyed. In later Jarre albums such as Zoolook (1984) or Rendez-Vous (1986), several parts of this album were used. An excerpt from "Musique pour Supermarché (Part 1)" was included on the 2018 compilation Planet Jarre.

Composition and recording 
In 1983, Jarre was approached to create background music for a supermarket-themed art show called Orrimbe, to be held in Paris during June, 1983. Jarre recorded the album between February and May of that year based on the analogy of a painting, of which there is always only one copy. So he decided to print a single LP copy of the album entitled Musique pour Supermarché (English: Music for Supermarkets) which would be auctioned just like the exhibits at the Orrimbe show, with the master tapes and plates destroyed. The auction was held on July 6, 1983, at the Hôtel Drouot auction house in Paris, and raised about 69,000 francs (equivalent to 22,000 euros or 8,300 dollars in that year) for charity. Jarre explained this was his protest at the "silly industrialisation of music". 

In the inside cover, 11 polaroid photos show the step-by-step creation of the disc, leaving one slot so that the final owner could add their photo with the album. The album owner was at first kept anonymous, but later revealed to be a M. Gerard, who after a car accident, had woken up to the radio playing Jarre's track "Souvenir de Chine" (from Les Concerts en Chine). Shortly after the auction, Jarre allowed Radio Luxembourg to broadcast the album once, in its entirety, and encouraged listeners to record the broadcast with the words "Piratez-moi!" (Pirate me!). Various parts used on this album would be reworked for later Jarre albums such as Zoolook (1984) or Rendez-Vous (1986).

Track listing

The duration of the tracks is calculated from bootleg recordings, as the album has never officially been released internationally.

 See also 
 Once Upon a Time in Shaolin'', an album by American hip hop artists Wu-Tang Clan of which only one copy was released
 List of most valuable records

References

Bibliography 
 

1983 albums
Jean-Michel Jarre albums